is a railway station on the Kōnan Railway Kōnan Line in the city of Kuroishi, Aomori, Japan, operated by the private railway operator Konan Railway.

Lines

Station layout

The station has a single bay platform serving two tracks, although Track 2 is seldom used. The station is fully attended.

Platforms

Adjacent stations

History
Kuroishi Station was opened on August 15, 1912 on the Japanese Government Railways . An adjacent Kōnan Kuroishi Station was built in 1950 for use by the Kōnan Line. On November 1, 1984, the Kuroishi Light Railway was sold to the Kōnan Railway Company, and the original Kuroishi Station was demolished. The station has been operated as a (kan'i itaku station) since November 1984. On April 1, 1986 a new station building was completed, and the station reverted to its original name. The Kuroishi Line ceased operations on April 1, 1998.

Surrounding area
Kuroishi City Hall
Kuroishi Post Office

Bus services

Kōnan Bus Company
For Aomori-Yadamae via Tobinai, Namioka, Shinjō and 
For Kōya via Mayajiri, Tobinai,  and Tarusawa
For Namioka Station via Hongō
For Hirosaki Bus terminal
via Tujinoki, Inakadate and Sakaizeki
via Guminoki, Takada, Hatakenaka, Toyomaki, and Wattoku-Kitaguchi
For  via Maeda-Yasiki
For Nijinoko-kōen via Yamagatachō and Itadome
For Nurukawa via Yamagatachō, Itadome and Nijinoko-kōen
For Ōwani Bus office via Tujinoki, Onoe, and

See also
 List of railway stations in Japan

External links

 

Railway stations in Aomori Prefecture
Konan Railway
Kuroishi, Aomori
Railway stations in Japan opened in 1912